Tomislav Kiš (born 4 April 1994) is a Croatian football forward who plays for Bosnian club Zrinjski Mostar.

Club career
Kiš was the top scorer in the under-17s Prva HNL in the 2010–11 season, playing for Croatia Sesvete, with 27 goals in 26 matches. He joined the Hajduk Split youth team the following season. After having scored 11 more goals in that competition during fall, he was moved in January 2012 to the Hajduk's first team by coach Krasimir Balakov. He made his debut for the first team as a late substitute in a 4–2 win against NK Zagreb on 2 March 2012. He scored his first goal in Prva HNL in a 3–0 victory over Zadar on 3 November 2012.

Due to a lack of playing time in the first team at Hajduk, Kiš was loaned out to second division side NK Dugopolje in January 2014, where he made an immediate impact, scoring four goals in his first three games. In his fourth game against NK Rudeš, Kiš was injured and missed the remainder of the season. For the first part of the 2014–15 season, Kiš was loaned to the second division side HNK Gorica. During his loan period at Gorica, Kiš scored 12 goals in seventeen league appearances for the club.

On 29 August 2015, Kiš announced that he will leave Hajduk due to the lack of first team playing and unhappiness with the contract. He joined K.V. Kortrijk for an undisclosed fee. Kiš scored 3 goals in 19 games in his first season with Kortrijk.

On 8 August 2016 he went on loan to play for Cercle Brugge.

From December 2018 he is contracted to FK Žalgiris in Lithuania. During the 2019 A Lyga he played in 31 matches and scored 27 goals to become the league's top scorer in 2019. In January 2020 Kiš was loaned to South Korea's Seongnam FC for a season, with the option for the club to purchase the player in the future.

On 3 February 2022, Kiš joined Mezőkövesd in Hungary on a 2.5-year contract.

International career
Kiš was a part of the Croatian national under-19 team in the first qualifying round for the 2013 UEFA European Under-19 Football Championship and scored six goals in three games. In the last match against Azerbaijan, he scored five times in a 7–1 victory.

Career statistics

Honours
Individual
 A Lyga Player of the Month: March 2019

References

External links

1994 births
Footballers from Zagreb
Croatian people of Hungarian descent
Living people
Croatian footballers
Association football forwards
Croatia youth international footballers
Croatia under-21 international footballers
HNK Hajduk Split players
NK Dugopolje players
HNK Gorica players
NK Zavrč players
K.V. Kortrijk players
Cercle Brugge K.S.V. players
FC Shakhtyor Soligorsk players
FK Žalgiris players
Seongnam FC players
Mezőkövesdi SE footballers
HŠK Zrinjski Mostar players
Croatian Football League players
First Football League (Croatia) players
Slovenian PrvaLiga players
Belgian Pro League players
Challenger Pro League players
Belarusian Premier League players
A Lyga players
K League 1 players
Nemzeti Bajnokság I players
Premier League of Bosnia and Herzegovina players
Croatian expatriate footballers
Expatriate footballers in Slovenia
Croatian expatriate sportspeople in Slovenia
Expatriate footballers in Belgium
Croatian expatriate sportspeople in Belgium
Expatriate footballers in Belarus
Croatian expatriate sportspeople in Belarus
Expatriate footballers in Lithuania
Croatian expatriate sportspeople in Lithuania
Expatriate footballers in South Korea
Croatian expatriate sportspeople in South Korea
Expatriate footballers in Hungary
Croatian expatriate sportspeople in Hungary
Expatriate footballers in Bosnia and Herzegovina
Croatian expatriate sportspeople in Bosnia and Herzegovina